Saqar Yelqi (also Romanized as Saqar Yelqī) is a village in Gorganbuy Rural District, in the Central District of Aqqala County, Golestan Province, Iran. At the 2006 census, its population was 989, in 184 families.

References 

Populated places in Aqqala County